Joseph C. Lewis (born 5 February 1937) is a British businessman and investor.

According to the Sunday Times Rich List in 2021, Lewis has a net worth of £4.33 billion, an increase of £338 million from 2020. Lewis is majority owner of the Premier League football team Tottenham Hotspur.

Early life
Lewis was born to a Jewish family above a public house in Roman Road, Bow, London. Lewis left school at 15 to help run his father's West End catering business, Tavistock Banqueting. When he took the reins, he quickly expanded it by selling luxury goods to American tourists, and also owned West End club the Hanover Grand, where he gave Robert Earl his first job. He later sold the business in 1979 to make his initial wealth.

Currency trading
After selling the family business in the late 1970s, Lewis moved into currency trading in the 1980s and 1990s, resulting in his move to the Bahamas where he is now a tax exile. In September 1992, Lewis teamed up with George Soros to bet on the pound's crashing out of the European Exchange Rate Mechanism. The event, which was dubbed Black Wednesday, made Lewis very wealthy. It has been suggested by some that he made more money from the event than Soros. Lewis is still an active foreign exchange trader.

Tavistock Group

Lewis is the main investor in Tavistock Group, which owns more than 200 companies in 15 countries.

Property 
Lewis hosted the Tavistock Cup tournament every March from 2004 through 2013, in Florida, raising millions of dollars for charity, and owns three of the six clubs that competed in 2013: Albany, Lake Nona Golf & Country Club and Isleworth Golf & Country Club. Lewis built a golf community in the Bahamas called Albany, which opened in October 2010. Lewis currently resides in Albany. Tiger Woods and Ernie Els are also major shareholders in the luxury resort community located in New Providence. Lewis made a £70 million investment in Bulgarian property development.

Lake Nona Medical City 

Lewis seeded Lake Nona, covering 7,000 acres next to Orlando's international airport, with $100 million in gifts and land which was cultivated into a large-scale community offering research and educational facilities, hospitals for veterans and children, a town center, and a range of workspaces and residential options.

Escondido Lake and controversy 
Since Lewis bought a property in Río Negro Province, Argentina, public access to Escondido lake has been under discussion. The Argentine law asserts that every water course is public and of free access. In 2009 Lewis was ordered by the Superior Tribunal de Justicia (STJ) to create and keep access to the lake, with "sufficient signage and to keep it transitable", but the ruling has not been enforced. Lewis' frontman Van Ditmer stated: "We are going to defend the private property with the Winchester in the hands; with blood if needed".

He is currently planning to use a huge protected area, four times the size of the city of Buenos Aires, for another private development, against the wishes of the locals. The property was bought for 69 pesos per hectare, currently about US$4. This low price was secured by using the name of a local 'poblador' on the deed, after which it was transferred to him. It is suggested that the Hidden Lake property is needed to supply water and (hydraulic) energy to this new property, dubbed the private state in Patagonia. In January 2017, new mass protests have started in El Bolson against this project.

Bear Stearns 

On 10 September 2007, Lewis paid US$860.4 million in an all-cash purchase of a 7% stake in Bear Stearns. By December 2007 Lewis had raised his stake at the brokerage firm to 9.4%, a total of 11 million shares, for which he paid an average price of $107 apiece. After the purchase of Bear Stearns by JP Morgan for $10 a share, it was estimated that Lewis lost $1.16 billion on his investment.

Mitchells & Butlers 

Lewis is the largest shareholder in the British public house group Mitchells & Butlers, controlling 26.85% of the issued share capital through his investment vehicle Piedmont, which he built up since 2008.

Personal life
Lewis has been married twice. 
His first marriage to Esther Browne ended in divorce. They had two children: Vivienne Lewis Silverton and Charles Lewis.
Vivienne Lewis Silverton is seen as his "heir" and serves on Tavistock's board of directors. She is divorced from Toby Silverton, the former chairman of Bristol Cars, once fully owned by Tavistock. She was engaged to the ex-Liverpool footballer Craig Johnston for 18 years in the 2000s to 2010s. Charles Lewis lives in Argentina, Lewis is now married to Jane Lewis.

Art collection

Lewis' art collection is estimated to be worth $1 billion and includes works by Picasso, Matisse, Lucian Freud and sculptor Henry Moore. Lewis bought Francis Bacon's Triptych 1974–1977 in 2008 for £26.3 million, then a record for postwar artwork bought in Europe. In November 2018 Joe Lewis sold his Portrait of an Artist (Pool with Two Figures) by David Hockney in Christie's salesroom for $90.3 million.

Lewis is the owner of several versions of Arturo Di Modica's iconic Charging Bull, including the original, which the artist installed during the middle of the night on 15 December 1989 on Wall Street with no prior permission from the authorities.

References

External links
Official site of Tavistock Group
The World's Billionaires 2013
Sunday Times Rich List 2012

1937 births
Living people
Bear Stearns
British billionaires
British expatriates in the Bahamas
British investors
British Jews
Businesspeople from London
Currency traders
Jewish art collectors
Jewish British philanthropists
Tavistock Group